The Platino Award for Best Screenplay (Spanish: Premio Platino al mejor guión) is one of the Platino Awards, Ibero-America's film awards, presented by the Entidad de Gestión de Derechos de los Productores Audiovisuales (EGEDA) and the Federación Iberoamericana de Productores Cinematográficos y Audiovisuales (FIPCA). It was first presented in 2014, with Sebastián Lelio and Gonzalo Maza being the first recipients of the award for the Chilean film Gloria.

The category includes both original and adapted screenplays.

In the list below. The winner of the award for each year is shown first, followed by the other nominees.

Awards and nominations

2010s

2020s

See also
 Goya Award for Best Original Screenplay
 Goya Award for Best Adapted Screenplay

References

External links
Official site

Screenwriting awards for film
Platino Awards